Euceraea is a genus of three species of shrubs and small trees in the willow family Salicaceae native to the Guiana Shield of northeastern South America. Previously it was treated in the family Flacourtiaceae but was moved along with its close relatives to the Salicaceae based on analyses of DNA data. Euceraea is closely related to the genera Casearia and Neoptychocarpus, but differs in its inflorescences of composite spikes. One species, Euceraea rheophytica, is a rheophyte.

References 

Salicaceae
Flora of South America
Salicaceae genera